In statistics, inverse-variance weighting is a method of aggregating two or more random variables to minimize the variance of the weighted average. Each random variable is weighted in inverse proportion to its variance, i.e. proportional to its precision.

Given a sequence of independent observations  with variances , the inverse-variance weighted average is given by

The inverse-variance weighted average has the least variance among all weighted averages, which can be calculated as

If the variances of the measurements are all equal, then the inverse-variance weighted average becomes the simple average.

Inverse-variance weighting is typically used in statistical meta-analysis or sensor fusion to combine the results from independent measurements.

Context
Suppose an experimenter wishes to measure the value of a quantity, say the acceleration due to gravity of Earth, whose true value happens to be . A careful experimenter makes multiple measurements, which we denote with  random variables . If they are all noisy but unbiased,  i.e., the measuring device does not systematically overestimate or underestimate the true value and the errors are scattered symmetrically, then the expectation value  . Note that this empirical average is also a random variable, whose expectation value  is  but also has a scatter. If the individual measurements are uncorrelated, the square of the error in the estimate is given by 
.

Instead of  repeated measurements with one instrument, if the experimenter makes  of the same quantity with  different instruments with varying quality of measurements, then there is no reason to expect the different  to be the same. Some instruments could be noisier than others.
The simple average is no longer an optimal estimator, since the error in  might actually exceed the error in the least noisy measurement if different measurements have very different errors. Instead of discarding the noisy measurements that increase the final error, the experimenter can combine all the measurements with appropriate weights so as to give more importance to the least noisy measurements and vice versa. The variance of the estimator , which for the optimal choice of the weights become 

Note that since , the estimator has a scatter smaller than the scatter in any individual measurement. Furthermore, the scatter in  decreases with adding more measurements, however noisier those measurements may be.

Derivation
Consider a generic weighted sum , where the weights  are normalised such that . 

Using a Lagrange multiplier  to enforce the constraint, we express the variance

For ,

which implies that

The main takeaway here is that . Since ,

The individual normalised weights are

It is easy to see that this extremum solution corresponds to the minimum from the second partial derivative test by noting that the variance is a quadratic function of the weights.
Thus, the minimum variance of the estimator is then given by

Normal Distributions

For normally distributed random variables inverse-variance weighted averages can also be derived as the maximum likelihood estimate for the true value. Furthermore, from a Bayesian perspective the posterior distribution for the true value given normally distributed observations  and a flat prior is a normal distribution with the inverse-variance weighted average as a mean and variance

Multivariate Case
For multivariate distributions an equivalent argument leads to an optimal weighting based on the covariance matrices  of the individual estimates :

For multivariate distributions the term "precision-weighted" average is more commonly used.

See also
Weighted least squares
Portfolio theory

References 

Meta-analysis
Estimation methods